The Fokker F.IX was an airliner developed in the Netherlands in the late 1920s, intended to provide KLM with an aircraft suitable for regular services to the Dutch East Indies. When the onset of the Great Depression forced the postponement of those plans, the market for this aircraft disappeared as well, although it did see military service in Czechoslovakia as a bomber.

Design and development
In the late 1920s, the Dutch airline KLM set out to develop commercial air services between Amsterdam and the Netherlands East Indies, and while the Fokker F.VII allowed it to operate an air mail service, a larger aircraft was wanted for passenger services. To meet this requirement, Fokker designed the F.IX, Fokker's largest three-engined monoplane, with KLM placing an order for Fokker's new design on 5 September 1928. The F.IX followed Fokker's normal layout for commercial aircraft, and was a high-wing cantilever monoplane with a fixed tailskid undercarriage. The wings were made of wood, and the fuselage was welded steel tube with a fabric covering. The two pilots sat side-by-side in an enclosed cockpit, while the first aircraft's passenger cabin had seats for up to 18 passengers when operating on European services, although only four–six passengers would be carried on the Far-East route.

A second example, registration PH-AFK, was ordered by KLM in May 1930. It had a longer nose compared with the first example, and a larger cabin which allowed up to 20 passengers to be carried. PH-AFK was exhibited at the 1930 Paris Air Show where it won the Grand Prix de Comfort et d'Elegance d'Avions de Transport, the "beauty prize" as voted by the public.

Czech aircraft manufacturer Avia purchased a licence to produce the type in order to create a bomber for the Czechoslovakian Air Force, when it was decided that the Fokker F.VII that Avia was already producing under licence was too small for this role. By 1932, 12 were in service as the F.39. Yugoslavia also purchased two aircraft, as well as a licence to produce the type domestically, although this did not occur. The F.39s differed from their civil counterparts not only by the addition of bomb racks, but also with a defensive machine gun being fitted to either a ventral "step" or a turret.  Avia also built two examples as airliners for Czechoslovakian Airlines as the F.IX D (Dopravni - "transport"). One of these survived into World War II, when it was impressed into Luftwaffe service (as TF+BO).

A further proposed military development by Avia, the twin-engine F.139, never left the drawing board.

Operational history
Even though KLM directors had been talking in terms of ten or more aircraft in 1929, the worsening economic climate resulted in only two being purchased. Due to the logistics implications of stocking spare parts for only two aircraft, these were confined to European routes and the two F.IXs each made only one flight to the Indies. One (registration PH-AFK) was written off in a crash on 4 August 1931, and the other (De Adelaar, PH-AGA) was retired in 1936, and was subsequently acquired by clandestine means to serve as a bomber in the Spanish Republican Air Force during the civil war.

Variants

Fokker
F-IX
Three-engined passenger airliner for KLM.

Avia
F.39 Three-engined bomber aircraft for the Czechoslovakian Air Force.
F.139 Proposed twin-engined version of the F.39. Not built.
F-IX D Three-engined passenger airliner for Czechoslovakian Airlines.

Operators

Zrakoplovstvo Nezavisne Države Hrvatske

Czechoslovakian Airlines operated two aircraft.
Czechoslovakian Air Force

Luftwaffe operated one captured aircraft.

KLM operated two aircraft.
 Spain
Spanish Republican Air Force

Yugoslav Royal Air Force

Accidents and incidents
 On August 4, 1931 a KLM F.IX crashed on takeoff from Waalhaven Airport due to engine failure; all 15 passengers and crew survived, but the aircraft was written off.

Specifications (Fokker F.IX)

Notes

Bibliography
 
 
 
 Taylor, John W. R., and Jean Alexander.Combat Aircraft of the World. New York: G.P. Putnam's Sons, 1969. .
 Taylor, Michael J. H. Jane's Encyclopedia of Aviation. London: Studio Editions, 1989. 
 Weale, Elke. Combat Aircraft of World War II. Simsbury, Connecticut: Bracken Books, 1985.

External links

 Fokker, a Living History
 Dutch Aviation
 

1920s Dutch airliners
F 09
Trimotors
High-wing aircraft
Aircraft first flown in 1929